Revisionist Maximalism was a short-lived movement and Jewish militant ideology which was part of the Brit HaBirionim faction of the Zionist Revisionist Movement (ZRM) created by Abba Ahimeir.

History

The ideology and political faction of Revisionist Maximalism was officially created in 1930 by Abba Ahimeir, a Jewish historian, journalist, and politician. He called for the Zionist Revisionist Movement (ZRM) to adopt the principles of totalitarianism to create an integralist "pure nationalism" amongst Jews. Ahimeir was originally a member of the Jewish Labour Movement who supported the October Revolution in Russia in 1917, and called for Jews to have their "own 1917" and spoke of the need for an October Revolution in Zionism. However Ahimeir grew disillusioned with Russian Bolshevism which he began to see as a Russian nationalist movement rather than a movement to promote international class struggle. Having become disillusioned with communism, Ahimeir grew nationalistic after the Arab-Jewish violence occurred in the British Mandate of Palestine from 1928 to 1929. 
Revisionist Maximalism rejects communism, humanism, internationalism, liberalism, pacifism and socialism; condemned liberal Zionists for only working for middle-class Jews rather than the Jewish nation as a whole. After the rise of anti-Jewish violence in the British Mandate of Palestine one year prior, support for the Brit HaBirionim faction of the ZRM soared, Brit HaBirionim quickly became the largest faction within the ZRM in 1930.

In 1930, Brit HaBirionim under Ahimeir's leadership publicly declared their desire to form a fascist state at the conference of the ZRM, saying:

Ahimeir claimed that the Jewish people would outlast Arab rule in the region of Palestine, saying:

Revisionist Maximalism and the Brit HaBirionim movement were fierce opponents of pacifism, while promoting militarism and demonstrated in 1932 against Norman Bentwich's inaugural lecture on peace to which Ahimeir saying that "It is not a cathedral to international peace in the name of Bentwich that we need, but a military academy in the name of Ze'ev Jabotinsky" and said "we can defend the honour of Israel ... not by filling our bellies with lectures on peace ... but rather by learning the doctrine of Jabotinsky". Brit HaBirionim demonstrators outside handed out leaflets declaring that peace studies were "the work of Satan" and were "an anti-Zionist measure, a stab in the back of Zionism.".

Ahimeir believed that his ideology would constitute a "neo-Revisionism" within the Zionist movement that he criticized, and advocated it at a meeting of the Hatzohar movement in Vienna in 1932, saying:
Zionism is imbued with the ghetto and pronouncements. The path to Jewish sovereignty has to cross a bridge of steel, not a bridge of paper. ... I bring to you a new form of social organization, one that is free of principles and parties ... I bring you Neo-Revisionism.

In 1932, Brit HaBirionim pressed the ZRM to adopt their policies which were titled the "Ten Commandments of Maximalism", which were made under "In the spirit of Complete Fascism", according to Stein Uglevik. Moderate ZRM members refused to accept this and moderate ZRM member Yaacov Kahan pressured Brit HaBirionim to accept the democratic nature of the ZRM and not push for the party to adopt fascist dictatorial policies.

Ideology
Revisionist Maximalists strongly supported the Italian fascist regime of Benito Mussolini and wanted the creation of a Jewish state based on fascist principles. The Revisionist Maximalists became the largest faction in the ZRM in 1930 but collapsed in support in 1933 after Ahmeirs support for the assassination of Hayim Arlosoroff.

The label of "fascist" has nevertheless to be regarded with reserves because in that period as later it was used often abusively in the disputes between opposed political non-fascist factions, as in the 1930s even the Social Democrat parties were accused by Stalin and the communists of being "fascists" or "social-fascists". In the same way in Palestine Revisionist Zionists themselves were often qualified in the 1930s as "fascists" by the Labor Zionist leaders and the Revisionists attacked the social democratic dominated General Confederation of Labor (Histadrut) and Ben Gurion by use of terms like "Red Swastika" and comparisons with fascism and Hitler.

See also
Fascism in Asia

References

Far-right politics in Israel
Fascist movements
Fascism in Asia
Jewish movements
Jewish fascists
Revisionist Zionism